Andy Souwer (born 9 November 1982) is a Dutch former welterweight kickboxer and mixed martial artist. He is a two-time K-1 World MAX champion (2005, 2007) and four-time Shootboxing World tournament champion as well as former It's Showtime 70MAX world champion, fighting out of Mejiro Gym in Amsterdam.

Biography and career 
Souwer started kickboxing when he was 7 years old at Ling Ho Gym in Den Bosch. He had his first kickboxing fight when he was 8 years old. He won all his fights, in all the weight classes he fought and became Dutch Champion.

In 1998, only 16 years old, Souwer fought his first A-Class MTBN Title match, which he won on points. When he was 18 he had three different World titles.

Souwer first went to Japan in 2002 to compete in the S-Cup 2002 shoot boxing competition where he became the winner after defeating Chinese sanshou title challenger Zheng Yuhao. He made his K-1 debut the next year and won his first K-1 World Max champion title in 2005.

Andy Souwer is the 2007 K-1 World Max Champion. He defeated Gago Drago followed by Albert Kraus and finally Masato to win the championship.
He faced Masato again in Masato's retirement match at the Dynamite!! 2009 event, and lost.

He was scheduled to face Naruepol Fairtex at Fighterzone Kickboxing World Series MAX in Singapore on 25 February 2012. However, they were not paid by the promoter and the fight did not happen.

He won the Shoot Boxing World Tournament 2012 in Tokyo, Japan on 17 November 2012 After beating Kem Sitsongpeenong by majority decision (29-29, 29-28, 30-28) at the quarter-final stage and knocking out Hiroki Shishido in the semis, he defeated stablemate and student Henri van Opstal by unanimous decision (30-29, 30-29, 30-28) in the final.

At the K-1 World MAX 2012 World Championship Tournament Final in Athens, Greece on 15 December 2012, Souwer outpointed Andy Ristie in the quarter-finals before losing a unanimous decision to Artur Kyshenko in the semis, in what was the fourth fight of their rivalry.

He lost to Dzhabar Askerov by split decision in the main event of Yokkao Extreme 2013 in Milan, Italy on 26 January 2013.

Souwer led a team of shoot boxers against a team of Pancrase fighters at Shoot Boxing 2013 - Act 4 on 23 June 2013. There was some controversy leading up to the event, with Souwer saying of the Pancrase representatives "in Holland, they are what we call B-level fighters" and Shoot Boxing founder and president Caesar Takeshi storming out of a pre-fight press conference, apparently so upset at Pancrase's disrespectful selection of opponents that he could no longer bear to be a part of the proceedings. Souwer knocked out his opponent, Kota Okazawa, with a left hook in round one.

Souwer was scheduled to fight Maximo Suarez at Enfusion Live: Tenerife in Tenerife, Spain on 13 July 2013 but withdrew for undisclosed reasons.

He took a unanimous decision over Yasuhiro Kido at the K-1 World MAX 2013 World Championship Tournament Final 16 in Mallorca, Spain on 14 September 2013.

He defeated Steve Moxon by unanimous decision at Shoot Boxing Battle Summit Ground Zero Tokyo 2013 in Tokyo, Japan on 15 November 2013.

He was scheduled to fight Enriko Kehl at the K-1 World MAX 2013 World Championship Tournament Quarter Finals - Part 1 in Foshan, China on 28 December 2013. However, he was unable to compete after suffering from a bout of appendicitis in the weeks prior to the event which forced him into hospital where they had to perform a routine but emergency surgical procedure to remove the troubled organ. His opponent, Kehl, was also unable to fight on the card after suffering numerous cuts in a fight with Buakaw earlier that month and was moved to K-1 World MAX 2013 World Championship Tournament Quarter Finals - Part 2 and matched with Shane Campbell.

Andy Souwer and Shemsi Beqiri were set to fight at SuperPro Fight Night VI in Basel, Switzerland on 25 January 2014 but Souwer withdrew due to his bout of appendicitis and was replaced by Foad Sadeghi.

He lost a split decision to Tsukuru Midorikawa at Rikix: No Kick, No Life 2014 in Tokyo, Japan on 11 February 2014.

Souwer made his professional boxing debut on 17 March 2014, winning by TKO after his opponent Paata Varduashvili retired in his corner at the end of the fourth round in Den Bosch, Netherlands.

He defeated Yuri Bessmertny via UD at Legend 3: Pour Homme in Milan, Italy on 5 April 2014.

Souwer announced his retirement following his loss to Marat Grigorian at ONE Championship: First Strike Kallang, Singapore on 15 October 2021.

Titles

Kickboxing
World Full Contact Association 
 2010 W.F.C.A. World Thaiboxing Super Welterweight (-70 kg) Champion
It's Showtime
 2012 It's Showtime "- 70 kg" World Champion
It's Showtime World Champion (70 kg)
K-1
K-1 World MAX 2009 Runner Up
K-1 World MAX 2007 Champion
K-1 World MAX 2006 Runner Up
K-1 World MAX 2005 Champion
A.R.D.D.D.
A.R.D.D.D. World Super welterweight Champion
F.I.M.C.
F.I.M.C. World Super welterweight Champion
World Professional Kickboxing Association
W.P.K.A. World Super welterweight Champion
International Sport Karate Association
I.S.K.A. World Super welterweight Champion
World Kickboxing Association
W.K.A. World Super welterweight Champion
World Muay Thai Association
W.M.T.A. World Super welterweight Champion

Shoot boxing
S-Cup
2012 S-cup World Champion
2008 S-cup World Champion
2006 S-cup Runner Up
2004 S-cup World Champion
2002 S-cup World Champion
World Shoot Boxing Association
W.S.B.A. World Super Welterweight Champion

Fight record

Kickboxing record

|-
|- style="background:#fbb;"
|  2021-10-15 || Loss || align="left" | Marat Grigorian || ONE Championship: First Strike || Kallang, Singapore || TKO (Leg Injury) || 2 || 2:26 
|-
! style=background:white colspan=9 |
|- style="background:#cfc;"
| 2020-12-04 || Win ||align=left| Zhang Chunyu || ONE Championship: Big Bang  || Kallang, Singapore || Decision (Unanimous) || 3 || 3:00
|- style="background:#fbb;"
|  2019-03-31 || Loss || align="left" | Yodsanklai Fairtex || |ONE Championship 93: A New Era || Tokyo, Japan || TKO (Punches) || 2 || 0:51
|-
|- style="background:#fbb;"
| 2018-10-06 || Loss ||align=left| Anthony Njokuani|| ONE Championship: Kingdom of Heroes  || Bangkok, Thailand || Decision (Split) || 3 || 3:00
|- style="background:#fbb;"
| 2018-02-17 || Loss ||align=left| Tayfun Özcan || Enfusion Live 62  || Eindhoven, Netherlands || KO (Overhand Right) || 4 || 2:12
|-
! colspan="8" style="background:white" |
|-  style="background:#cfc;"
| 2016-11-11 || Win ||align=left| Miyakoshi Souichiro || Shootboxing 2016|| Tokyo, Japan || Decision (unanimous) || 3 || 3:00
|-  style="background:#cfc;"
| 2016-04-03 || Win ||align=left| Mohamed Khamal ||  World Fighting League || Hoofddorp, Netherlands ||Decision(Unanimous) ||  3|| 3:00
|-
|-  style="background:#cfc;"
| 2016-01-23 || Win ||align=left| Damian Segovia ||Golden Fight League || Rosario, Argentina || TKO (Arm Injury) || 1 || 3:00 
|-
|-  style="background:#cfc;"
| 2015-12-01 || Win ||align=left| Kuniyoshi Hironaka ||Shootboxing 30th Anniversary || Tokyo, Japan || Decision (Unanimous) || 3 || 3:00 
|-  style="background:#fbb;"
| 2015-09-16 || Loss ||align=left| Hinata Watanabe || Rebels. 38 || Tokyo, Japan || Decision (Unanimous) || 3 || 3:00
|- style="" bgcolor=""
| 2015-08-22 || Ex ||align=left| Caesar Takeshi || Shoot Boxing 30th Anniversary “Caesar Time!” || Ota, Tokyo, Japan || No Decision || 1 || 3:00
|-  style="background:#fbb;"
| 2015-04-18 || Loss ||align=left| Jonay Risco || Enfusion Live 27 || Tenerife, Spain || Decision(Extra Round) || 4 || 
|-  style="background:#cfc;"
| 2015-04-04 || Win ||align=left| Dong Wenfei || Wu Lin Feng  || China || Decision (Unanimous)  || 3 || 3:00
|-  style="background:#cfc;"
| 2015-02-11 || Win ||align=left| Hideya Tanaka || No Kick, No Life 2015 || Tokyo, Japan || KO (Left High Kick) || 3 || 0:11
|-  style="background:#fbb;"
| 2015-01-03 || Loss ||align=left| Sitthichai Sitsongpeenong || Kunlun Fight 15: The World MAX Return - Middleweight Tournament, Final || Nanjing, China || Decision(Unanimous) || 3 || 3:00
|-  style="background:#cfc;"
| 2015-01-03 || Win ||align=left| Jiao Fukai || Kunlun Fight 15: The World MAX Return - Middleweight Tournament, Semi Finals || Nanjing, China || TKO (retirement) || 3 || 3:00
|-  style="background:#cfc;"
| 2014-11-30 || Win ||align=left| Kuniyoshi Hironaka || S-cup 2014 || Tokyo, Japan || TKO (second stoppage) || 3 || 0:32   
|-  style="background:#cfc;"
| 2014-11-23 || Win ||align=left| Ardalan Sheikholeslami  || Enfusion Live 22|| Groningen, Netherlands || TKO (punches) || 4 || 2:40
|-
! colspan="8" style="background:white" |
|-  style="background:#cfc;"
| 2014-10-18 || Win ||align=left| Max Baumert || It's Fight Time  || Darmstadt, Germany || TKO (Strikes) || 2 || 1:56    
|-  style="background:#fbb;"
| 2014-07-27 || Loss ||align=left| Mustapha Haida || Kunlun Fight 7 - World MAX 2014 Final 16 || Zhoukou, China || Decision(Unanimous) || 4 || 3:00
|-  style="background:#cfc;"
| 2014-07-12 || Win ||align=left| Yasuhiro Kido || RISE 100 - Blade 0  || Tokyo, Japan || Decision || 4 ||  3:00  
|-  style="background:#cfc;"
| 2014-04-05 || Win ||align=left| Yuri Bessmertny || Legend 3: Pour Homme || Milan, Italy || Decision (unanimous)  || 3 || 3:00
|-  style="background:#fbb;"
| 2014-02-11 || Loss ||align=left| Tsukuru Midorikawa || Rikix: No Kick, No Life 2014  || Tokyo, Japan || Decision (split) || 3 || 3:00
|-  style="background:#cfc;"
| 2013-11-16 || Win ||align=left| Steve Moxon || Shoot Boxing Battle Summit Ground Zero Tokyo 2013 || Tokyo, Japan || Decision (unanimous) || 3 || 3:00
|-  style="background:#cfc;"
| 2013-09-14 || Win ||align=left| Yasuhiro Kido || K-1 World MAX 2013 World Championship Tournament Final 16, First Round || Mallorca, Spain || Decision (unanimous) || 3 || 3:00
|-  style="background:#cfc;"
| 2013-06-23 || Win ||align=left| Kota Okazawa || Shoot Boxing 2013 - Act 4 || Tokyo, Japan || KO (left hook) || 1 || 1:43
|-  style="background:#fbb;"
| 2013-01-26 || Loss ||align=left| Dzhabar Askerov || Yokkao Extreme 2013 || Milan, Italy || Decision (split) || 3 || 3:00
|-  style="background:#fbb;"
| 2012-12-15 || Loss ||align=left| Artur Kyshenko|| K-1 World MAX 2012 World Championship Tournament Final, Semi Finals || Athens, Greece || Decision (unanimous) || 3 || 3:00
|-  style="background:#cfc;"
| 2012-12-15 || Win ||align=left| Andy Ristie|| K-1 World MAX 2012 World Championship Tournament Final, Quarter Finals || Athens, Greece || Decision (unanimous) || 3 || 3:00
|-  style="background:#cfc;"
| 2012-11-17 || Win ||align=left| Henri van Opstal || Shoot Boxing World Tournament 2012, Final || Tokyo, Japan || Decision (unanimous) || 3 || 3:00
|-
! colspan="8" style="background:white" |
|-  style="background:#cfc;"
| 2012-11-17 || Win ||align=left| Hiroki Shishido || Shoot Boxing World Tournament 2012, Semi Finals || Tokyo, Japan || TKO (punches) || 1 || 2:00
|-  style="background:#cfc;"
| 2012-11-17 || Win ||align=left| Kem Sitsongpeenong || Shoot Boxing World Tournament 2012, Quarter Finals || Tokyo, Japan || Decision (majority) || 3 || 3:00
|-  style="background:#cfc;"
| 2012-07-21 || Win ||align=left| Zeben Diaz || It's Showtime 59 || Tenerife, Spain || Decision || 3 || 3:00
|-  style="background:#cfc;"
| 2012-06-30 || Win ||align=left| Chris Ngimbi || It's Showtime 57&58 || Brussels, Belgium || Decision  || 5 || 3:00
|-
! colspan="8" style="background:white" |
|-  style="background:#cfc;"
| 2012-05-27 || Win ||align=left| Abraham Roqueñi || K-1 World MAX 2012 World Championship Tournament Final 16, First Round || Madrid, Spain || Decision (2-1) || 3 || 3:00
|-
! colspan="8" style="background:white" |
|-  style="background:#cfc;"
| 2012-04-13|| Win ||align=left| Satoru Suzuki || Road to S-Cup Act 2  || Tokyo, Japan || TKO (Strikes) || 4 || 1:09
|-  style="background:#cfc;"
| 2011-11-06 || Win ||align=left| Toby Imada || Shoot the Shooto 2011  || Bunkyō, Tokyo, Japan || Decision (Unanimous) || 3 || 3:00
|-  style="background:#fbb;"
| 2011-09-24 || Loss ||align=left| Artur Kyshenko || It's Showtime "Fast & Furious 70MAX", Semi Finals || Brussels, Belgium || Decision (Unanimous) || 3 || 3:00   
|-  style="background:#cfc;"
| 2011-09-24 || Win ||align=left| Harut Grigorian || It's Showtime "Fast & Furious 70MAX", Quarter Finals || Brussels, Belgium || Ext. Round Decision (Split) || 4 || 3:00   
|-  style="background:#cfc;"
| 2011-04-23 || Win ||align=left| Yoshihiro Sato || Shootboxing 2011 Act 2 || Tokyo, Japan || Decision (3-0) || 3 || 3:00 
|-  style="background:#cfc;"
| 2011-03-06 || Win ||align=left| L'houcine Ouzgni || It's Showtime Sporthallen Zuid || Amsterdam, Netherlands || Decision (Unanimous) || 3 || 3:00 
|-  style="background:#fbb;"
| 2011-02-05 || Loss ||align=left| Abraham Roqueñi || El Desafio K-1 Rules || Málaga, Spain || Decision(Decision) || 3 || 3:00 
|-  style="background:#cfc;"
| 2010-12-11 || Win ||align=left| Pajonsuk || Yiannis Evgenikos presents: It’s Showtime Athens || Athens, Greece || Decision (5-0) || 3 || 3:00
|-  style="background:#fbb;"
| 2010-11-23 || Loss  ||align=left| Toby Imada || Shoot Boxing World Tournament 2010, Semi-final || Bunkyō, Tokyo, Japan || Decision (Split) || 3 || 3:00
|-  style="background:#cfc;"
| 2010-11-23 || Win ||align=left| Bovy Sor Udomson || Shoot Boxing World Tournament 2010, Quarter-final || Bunkyō, Tokyo, Japan || KO (Right hook) || 3 || 0:47
|-  style="background:#cfc;"
| 2010-09-18 || Win  ||align=left| Hinata Watanabe || Shoot Boxing "Ishin 4" || Bunkyō, Tokyo, Japan || KO (Choke) || 1 || 0:48
|-  style="background:#cfc;"
| 2010-01-30 || Win  ||align=left| Faldir Chahbari || Beast of the East || Zutphen, Netherlands || Decision || 5 || 3:00
|-
! colspan="8" style="background:white" |
|-  style="background:#fbb;"
| 2009-12-31 || Loss ||align=left| Masato || Dynamite!! 2009 || Saitama (city), Japan || Decision (Unanimous) || 5 || 3:00
|-  style="background:#fbb;"
| 2009-10-26 || Loss ||align=left| Giorgio Petrosyan || K-1 World MAX 2009 Final, Final || Yokohama, Japan || Decision (Unanimous) || 3 || 3:00
|-
! colspan="8" style="background:white" |
|-  style="background:#cfc;"
| 2009-10-26 || Win ||align=left| Buakaw Banchamek || K-1 World MAX 2009 Final, Semi Finals || Yokohama, Japan || Ext. R Decision (Split) || 4 || 3:00
|-  style="background:#cfc;"
| 2009-07-13 || Win ||align=left| Artur Kyshenko || K-1 World MAX 2009 Final 8 || Tokyo, Japan || Ext. R Decision (Unanimous) || 4 || 3:00
|-
! colspan="8" style="background:white" |
|-  style="background:#cfc;"
| 2009-05-16 ||Win  ||align=left| Chaid Oulad El Hadj || It's Showtime 2009 Amsterdam || Amsterdam, Netherlands || Decision (Unanimous) || 3 || 3:00
|-  style="background:#cfc;"
| 2009-04-21 ||Win  ||align=left| Leroy Kaestner || K-1 World MAX 2009 Final 16 || Fukuoka, Japan || Decision (Unanimous) || 3 || 3:00
|-
! colspan="8" style="background:white" |
|-  style="background:#fbb;"
| 2009-03-14 ||Loss  ||align=left| Giorgio Petrosyan || Oktagon presents: It's Showtime 2009 || Milan, Italy || Ext. R Decision (Unanimous) || 4 || 3:00
|-  style="background:#cfc;"
| 2008-11-24 ||Win  ||align=left| Kenichi Ogata || Shoot Boxing World Tournament 2008, Final || Saitama, Japan || KO (Left high kick) || 2 || 2:11
|-
! colspan="8" style="background:white" |
|-  style="background:#cfc;"
| 2008-11-24 ||Win  ||align=left| Hiroki Shishido || Shoot Boxing World Tournament 2008, Semi Finals || Saitama, Japan || Decision (Unanimous) || 3 || 3:00
|-  style="background:#cfc;"
| 2008-11-24 ||Win  ||align=left| Edvin-Erik Kibus || Shoot Boxing World Tournament 2008, Quarter Finals || Saitama, Japan || TKO (Ref. stop/2 knockdowns) || 1 || 2:44
|-  style="background:#fbb;"
| 2008-10-01 ||Loss  ||align=left| Artur Kyshenko || K-1 World MAX 2008 Final, Semi Finals || Tokyo, Japan || Ext. R Decision (Unanimous) || 4 || 3:00
|-  style="background:#cfc;"
| 2008-07-07 ||Win  ||align=left| Warren Stevelmans || K-1 World MAX 2008 Final 8 || Tokyo, Japan || Decision (Unanimous) || 3 || 3:00
|-  style="background:#cfc;"
| 2008-04-09 ||Win  ||align=left| Mike Zambidis || K-1 World MAX 2008 Final 16 || Hiroshima, Japan || Ext.R KO (Left high kick) || 4 || 2:05
|-
! colspan="8" style="background:white" |
|-  style="background:#cfc;"
| 2008-03-02 ||Win  ||align=left| Yodsaenklai Fairtex || SLAMM "Nederland vs Thailand IV" || Almere, Netherlands || Ext.R Decision (Unanimous) || 4 || 3:00
|-  style="background:#cfc;"
| 2007-11-24 ||Win  ||align=left| Nieky Holzken || Shootboxing in the Autotron || Rosmalen, Netherlands || Decision (Unanimous) || 3 || 3:00
|-  style="background:#cfc;"
| 2007-10-28 ||Win  ||align=left| Andy Ologun || Shoot Boxing Battle Summit "Ground Zero" || location?, Japan || Decision (Unanimous) || 3 || 3:00
|-  style="background:#cfc;"
| 2007-10-03 ||Win  ||align=left| Masato || K-1 World MAX 2007 Final, Final || Tokyo, Japan || TKO (Corner stop) || 2 || 3:00
|-
! colspan="8" style="background:white" |
|-  style="background:#cfc;"
| 2007-10-03 ||Win  ||align=left| Albert Kraus || K-1 World MAX 2007 Final, Semi Finals || Tokyo, Japan || Decision (Majority) || 3 || 3:00
|-  style="background:#cfc;"
| 2007-10-03 ||Win  ||align=left| Gago Drago || K-1 World MAX 2007 Final, Quarter Finals || Tokyo, Japan || KO (Right hook) || 2 || 1:43
|-  style="background:#cfc;"
| 2007-06-28 ||Win  ||align=left| Ole Laursen || K-1 World MAX 2007 Final 16 || Tokyo, Japan || KO (Overhand Right) || 1 || 2:07
|-
! colspan="8" style="background:white" |
|-  style="background:#cfc;"
| 2007-05-25 ||Win  ||align=left| Wei Shoulei || Shootboxing vs Sanda || Japan || Decision (Unanimous) || 3 || 3:00
|-  style="background:#cfc;"
| 2007-05-06 ||Win  ||align=left| Joerie Mes || SLAMM "Nederland vs Thailand III" || Haarlem, Netherlands || Decision (Unanimous) || 3 || 3:00
|-  style="background:#cfc;"
| 2007-04-04 ||Win  ||align=left| Yoshihiro Sato || K-1 World MAX 2007 World Elite Showcase || Yokohama, Japan || Decision (Unanimous) || 3 || 3:00
|-  style="background:#fbb;"
| 2006-11-03 ||Loss  ||align=left| Kenichi Ogata || Shoot Boxing World Tournament 2006, Final || Tokyo, Japan || Decision (Unanimous) || 3 || 3:00
|-
! colspan="8" style="background:white" |
|-  style="background:#cfc;"
| 2006-11-03 ||Win  ||align=left| Daniel Dawson || Shoot Boxing World Tournament 2006, Semi Finals || Tokyo, Japan || Decision (Unanimous) || 3 || 3:00
|-  style="background:#cfc;"
| 2006-11-03 ||Win  ||align=left| Marfio Canoletti || Shoot Boxing World Tournament 2006, Quarter Finals || Tokyo, Japan || Decision (Unanimous) || 3 || 3:00
|-  style="background:#cfc;"
| 2006-09-04 ||Win  ||align=left| Takayuki Kohiruimaki || K-1 World MAX 2006 Champions' Challenge || Tokyo, Japan || Decision (Unanimous) || 3 || 3:00
|-  style="background:#fbb;"
| 2006-06-30 ||Loss ||align=left| Buakaw Por.Pramuk || K-1 World MAX 2006 Final, Final || Yokohama, Japan || TKO (Referee Stoppage) || 2 || 2:13
|-
! colspan="8" style="background:white" |
|-  style="background:#cfc;"
| 2006-06-30 ||Win  ||align=left| Masato || K-1 World MAX 2006 Final, Semi Finals || Yokohama, Japan || Decision (Unanimous) || 3 || 3:00
|-  style="background:#cfc;"
| 2006-06-30 ||Win  ||align=left| Virgil Kalakoda || K-1 World MAX 2006 Final, Quarter Finals || Yokohama, Japan || TKO (Ref. stop/3 knockdowns) || 3 || 2:23
|-  style="background:#cfc;"
| 2006-05-26 ||Win  ||align=left| Takashi Ono || Shootboxing: NEO OPOPOZ Series 3rd. || Tokyo, Japan || Decision (Unanimous) || 5 || 3:00
|-  style="background:#cfc;"
| 2006-04-05 ||Win  ||align=left| Tsogto Amara || K-1 World MAX 2006 World Tournament Open || Tokyo, Japan || Ext. R Decision (Unanimous) || 4 || 3:00
|-
! colspan="8" style="background:white" |
|-  style="background:#cfc;"
| 2006-02-25 ||Win  ||align=left| Pan-Soo Kim || K-1 Fighting Network KHAN 2006 in Busan || Busan, South Korea || Decision (Unanimous) || 3 || 3:00
|-  style="background:#cfc;"
| 2005-11-25 ||Win  ||align=left| Jadamba Narantungalag || Shootboxing: 20th Anniversary Series Final || location?, Japan || Decision (Unanimous) || 5 || 3:00
|-  style="background:#cfc;"
| 2005-10-12 ||Win  ||align=left| Kozo Takeda || K-1 World MAX 2005 Champions' Challenge || Tokyo, Japan ||  KO (Punches) || 2 || 0:31
|-  style="background:#cfc;"
| 2005-07-20 ||Win  ||align=left| Buakaw Por.Pramuk || K-1 World MAX 2005 Final, Final || Yokohama, Japan || 2 Ext. R Decision (Split) || 5 || 3:00
|-
! colspan="8" style="background:white" |
|-  style="background:#cfc;"
| 2005-07-20 ||Win  ||align=left| Yasuhiro Kazuya || K-1 World MAX 2005 Final, Semi Finals || Yokohama, Japan || TKO (Doc stop) || 1 || 2:24
|-  style="background:#cfc;"
| 2005-07-20 ||Win  ||align=left| Takayuki Kohiruimaki || K-1 World MAX 2005 Final, Quarter Finals || Yokohama, Japan || Decision (Unanimous) || 3 || 3:00
|-  style="background:#cfc;"
| 2005-05-04 ||Win  ||align=left| Marfio Canoletti || K-1 World MAX 2005 Open || Tokyo, Japan || Decision (Unanimous) || 3 || 3:00
|-
! colspan="8" style="background:white" |
|-  style="background:#c5d2ea;"
| 2005-03-26 ||Draw  ||align=left| Alviar Lima || East Side 4 || Amsterdam, Netherlands || Decision draw || 5 || 3:00
|-  style="background:#cfc;"
| 2004-11-05 ||Win  ||align=left| Kuntap Weerasakreck || Shootboxing: Infinity-S Vol.5 || location?, Japan ||  KO (Punches) || 5 || 2:12
|-  style="background:#cfc;"
| 2004-09-19 ||Win  ||align=left| Hiroki Shishido || Shoot Boxing World Tournament 2004, Final || Yokohama, Japan || TKO || 2 || 0:50
|-
! colspan="8" style="background:white" |
|-  style="background:#cfc;"
| 2004-09-19 ||Win  ||align=left| Changpuek Chorsepasert || Shoot Boxing World Tournament 2004, Semi Finals || Yokohama, Japan || Decision (Unanimous) || 3 || 3:00
|-  style="background:#cfc;"
| 2004-09-19 ||Win  ||align=left| Ole Laursen || Shoot Boxing World Tournament 2004, Quarter Finals || Yokohama, Japan || KO (Punches) || 1 || 2:55
|-  style="background:#cfc;"
| 2004-02-01 ||Win  ||align=left| Hiroyuki Doi || Shoot boxing: Infinity-S Vol.1 || Japan || TKO || 4 || 1:11
|-
! colspan="8" style="background:white" |
|-  style="background:#cfc;"
| 2003-11-18 ||Win  ||align=left| Takehiro Murahama || K-1 World MAX 2003 Champions' Challenge || Tokyo, Japan || Decision (Unanimous) || 3 || 3:00
|-  style="background:#cfc;"
| 2003-09-23 ||Win  ||align=left| Carlos Condit || Shootboxing: "S" of the World Vol. 5 || location?, Japan || TKO (Low Kicks) || 5 || 2:43
|-  style="background:#fbb;"
| 2003-07-05 ||Loss ||align=left| Albert Kraus || K-1 World MAX 2003 Final, Quarter Finals || Saitama, Japan || TKO (Doc stop) || 1 || 3:00
|-  style="background:#cfc;"
| 2003-04-13 ||Win  ||align=left| Shane Chapman || Shootboxing: "S" of the World Vol. 2 || Tokyo, Japan || Ext. R Disq. (Low Blow) || 6 || 1:01
|-  style="background:#cfc;"
| 2002-11-05 ||Win  ||align=left| Kenichi Ogata || Shootboxing: The Age of "S" Vol.5 || Tokyo, Japan || Decision (Unanimous) || 5 || 3:00
|-  style="background:#cfc;"
| 2002-09-22 ||Win  ||align=left| Ryuji Goto || Shootboxing: The Age of "S" Vol.4 || location?, Japan || Decision (Unanimous) || 5 || 3:00
|-  style="background:#cfc;"
| 2002-07-07 ||Win  ||align=left| Zheng Yuhao  ||Shoot Boxing World Tournament 2002, Final || Yokohama, Japan || Ext. R Decision (Majority) || 4 || 3:00
|-
! colspan="8" style="background:white" |
|-  style="background:#cfc;"
| 2002-07-07 ||Win  ||align=left| Hiroyuki Doi || Shoot Boxing World Tournament 2002, Semi Finals || Yokohama, Japan || KO (Punch) || 1 || 1:59
|-  style="background:#cfc;"
| 2002-07-07 ||Win  ||align=left| Manoel Fonseca || Shoot Boxing World Tournament 2002, Quarter Finals || Yokohama, Japan || TKO (Ref Stop/2 Knockdowns) || 2 || 2:58
|-  style="background:#fbb;"
| 2002-06-08 ||Loss ||align=left| Najim Ettouhlali || Muay Thai Champions League VII || Rotterdam, Netherlands || TKO (Doctor Stoppage) || 4 || 3:00
|-  style="background:#cfc;"
| 2002-02-17 ||Win ||align=left| Najim Ettouhlali || WPKL Gala in Hogendorphal || Amsterdam, Netherlands || Decision (Unanimous) || 5 || 3:00
|-  style="background:#cfc;"
| 2001-11-03 ||Win ||align=left| Abdel Bchiri || Gala in Breidushal || Amsterdam, Netherlands || KO || 1 || 
|-  style="background:#cfc;"
| 2001-09-23 ||Win ||align=left| Ozkan Kose || Battle of Arnhem III || Arnhem, Netherlands || Decision || 7 || 2:00
|-  style="background:#cfc;"
| 2001-03-24 ||Win ||align=left| Chris van Venrooij || WKPL Gala || Maastricht, Netherlands || || || 
|-  style="background:#cfc;"
| 2001-01-27 ||Win ||align=left| Rafi Zouheir || Thaiboxing from Rabat || Rabat, Morocco || Decision || 5 || 3:00
|-  style="background:#fbb;"
| 2000-06-04 ||Loss ||align=left| Stjepan Veselic || Night of Revenge || Haarlem, Netherlands || KO || 1 || 
|-  style="background:#cfc;"
| 1999-02-07 ||Win ||align=left| Chris van Venrooij || Matter of Honor || Rotterdam, Netherlands || Decision || 5 || 3:00
|-
| colspan=9 | Legend:

Boxing record

|-  style="background:#cfc;"
| 2014-03-17 || Win ||align=left| Paata Varduashvili || Theater aan de Parade || Den Bosch, Netherlands || TKO (retirement) || 4 || 3:00
|-
| colspan=9 | Legend:

Mixed martial arts record

|-
|Loss
|align=center|2–3
|Akiyo Nishiura 
|Decision (unanimous)
|Rizin World Grand Prix 2017: Opening Round - Part 2
|
|align=center|3
|align=center|5:00
|Fukuoka, Japan
|
|-
|Win
|align=center|2–2
|Massaro Glunder 
|Submission (armbar)
|World Fighting League MMA
|
|align=center|3
|align=center|N/A
|Almere, Netherlands 
|
|-
|Loss
|align=center|1–2
|Kazuyuki Miyata 
|Submission (armbar)
|Rizin World Grand-Prix 2016: Second Round 
|
|align=center|1
|align=center|4:39
|Saitama, Japan
|
|-
|Loss
|align=center|1–1
|Daron Cruickshank
|Submission (rear-naked choke)
|Rizin World Grand-Prix 2016: First Round 
|
|align=center|1
|align=center|4:09
|Saitama, Japan
|
|-
|Win
|align=center|1–0
|Yuichiro Nagashima
|TKO (punches)
|Rizin Fighting Federation - Iza no Mai
|
|align=center|1
|align=center|5:29
|Saitama, Japan
|

See also 
List of male kickboxers
List of K-1 champions
List of It's Showtime (kickboxing) champions 
Shoot boxing

References

External links
 ONE Championship profile
 

1982 births
Living people
Dutch male kickboxers
Welterweight kickboxers
Light-middleweight boxers
Sportspeople from 's-Hertogenbosch
Dutch male boxers
Kunlun Fight kickboxers
ONE Championship kickboxers
Dutch male mixed martial artists
Mixed martial artists utilizing shootboxing
Mixed martial artists utilizing boxing